This is a complete list of football clubs in Luxembourg affiliated to the Luxembourg Football Federation, the governing body for football in Luxembourg.

A

B

C

D

E

F

G

H

J

K

L

M

N

O

P

R

S

T

U

V

W

Y

References

 
Luxembourg
Football clubs in Luxembourg
Football clubs